The Cut is a 2017 Kenyan film directed by Peter Wangugi Gitau.

Plot
The film is about a young boy who is trying to save his younger sister from an early marriage and Female Genital Mutilation. The children manage to escape their plights and end up in a very unforgiving situation.

Cast
 Ibrahim Rashid
 Halima Jatan 
 Onesmus Kamau 
 Miriam Kinuthia

Production
A participatory approach was adopted in the development of the film. To form a foundation for the script, children from the AMREF Dagoretti Child Protection and Development Centre penned down their experiences, and those of the society around them, which inspired the script touching on topics such as the abuse of children’s rights, alcoholism, maternal health and child marriage.

Release
The Cut (2017) premiered at the Silicon Valley African Film Festival in San Jose, on 30 September 2018. The film premiered in Kenya on 16 May 2018 at the 'European Film Festival' in Nairobi. 'The Cut' has also screened at the 2017 Cape Town International Film Market and Festival in Cape Town, South Africa on 13 October 2017, at the Toronto Black Film Festival in Toronto, Canada on 16 February 2018.

Accolades
 Award for Best Feature at the 2nd Africa Diaspora Cinema Festival in Florence, Italy in July 2018.
 Nomination for Best Feature Film at the 8th Kalasha TV & Film Awards, to be held on 24 November 2018.

References

2017 films
Swahili-language films
Films set in 2017
Kenyan drama films